The Edinburgh University Music Society (EUMS) is a student-run musical organisation based in Edinburgh. Since its founding in 1867, the EUMS has been based within the University of Edinburgh.

The society performs in three concert series throughout the year whilst also undertaking a programme of charity events and education projects.

History
The Edinburgh University Music Society is the oldest student’s musical society in Scotland and can be traced back to its origins in a concert in February 1867: the 27th Reid Memorial Concert. This concert was unusual in that, rather than exclusively relying on the professional players within Edinburgh at the time, as had been normal up until this point, the performance was cast as a "University Amateur Concert". It consisted of a selection of musicians from around the University of Edinburgh, most students, some academics, and others members of the St. Cecilia Instrumental Society.

They were led by the then professor Herbert Oakeley in George Street’s Music Hall (now the Assembly Rooms). That summer a draft constitution was set down and at the commencement of the next academic year the first students rehearsed under Oakeley for the first time in what became known as the Edinburgh University Musical Society.

The society first performed in what became an annual concert in March 1868. Oakeley soon called on his influence to enhance the standing of the society, and in 1872 the Edinburgh University Musical Society performed alongside the Hallé Orchestra from Manchester and a selection of well-known artists of the time. This performance began a three-day festival devoted to the continuation of General John Reid’s passion for music.

Carl Orff’s Carmina Burana was premiered in Scotland by the EUMS in 1963, and the BBC has made recordings of several EUMS concerts. In 2007, the society celebrated its 140th anniversary with a series of concerts in the impressive McEwan Hall, ending with a widely acclaimed rendition of Verdi’s Requiem to a thousand-strong audience.

Structure

The society in its current form consists of three ensembles: Chorus, Sinfonia and the Symphony Orchestra.

Chorus
The largest ensemble in the Edinburgh University Music Society is the Chorus, conducted by Neil Metcalfe. It consists of between 150 and 200 people and is non-auditioned. Recent performances have included Jenkins' Armed Man and Bruckner's Te Deum.

Sinfonia
Sinfonia, a full symphony orchestra conducted by Sam McLellan, consists of auditioned players apart from the string section which is non-auditioning. Alongside Chorus, they perform a large choral piece every other year.

Symphony Orchestra
The Symphony Orchestra, a large fully auditioning orchestra of high standard, is conducted by Russell Cowieson. They perform works from a wide range of composers including romantic and 20th century artists. Recent performances have included pieces by Mahler, Shostakovich, Sibelius, Dvořák, Tchaikovsky, Chausson and Rimsky-Korsakov, amongst others. As with Sinfonia, the Symphony Orchestra perform with Chorus once every two years. In 2011 this piece was Elgar's Dream of Gerontius.

Activities

Work with charity
An excerpt from the Society's minutes in 1957 indicates that the Edinburgh University Music Society has been involved with supporting charities since at least the 1950s.

More recently, EUMS has worked with Scottish charity the Bethany Christian Trust to host the Big Sing 2012. The Big Sing is a come and sing Handel's Messiah, raising money for the Bethany Christian Trust's Stop Homelessness campaign. The project ran for the first time in 2011 when it raised over £1300 for the charity. Following this, EUMS collaborated with Drake Music Scotland in 2013. Drake Music Scotland is a Scottish charity that enables children and adults with disabilities to learn, compose and perform music. Through carolling projects, EUMS raised £600 for them.

Work in education
In the early 2000s, the Edinburgh University Music Society piloted a project where a group of members went to Edinburgh schools for an afternoon presentation about classical music and the structure of the orchestra. For the next few years the project developed and greatly contributed to the society being awarded the Edinburgh University Students' Association Community Action Award in 2010. The project currently runs on an annual basis, and is a series of hour-long education projects. Members from the society show local primary school students the workings of an orchestra, and a choir, and the pupils are able to learn all about the different instruments and voices.

EUMS takes an active interest in music education; other projects run by the society have included free entry to EUMS concerts when a school booked a class to attend, collaborative performances between a school ensemble and members of the society, and group master-classes hosted by senior players. All concert and tour programmes run by EUMS welcome audiences of all ages, and the society as a whole looks to promote classical music within the University of Edinburgh and the wider community.

Tours
The EUMS regularly tours to locations across the United Kingdom and Europe. These usually consist of a touring orchestra and chorus. Recent tours have included destinations such as Ireland, Belgium, France, Holland and Norway.

Notable alumni

Patrons
 1957–1983 Sir Adrian Boult
 1963–1982 Carl Orff

Conductors

Other members
 Sir Alexander Mackenzie
 Donald Runnicles
 James MacMillan

See also
 The Edinburgh Society of Organists

References

External links
 EUMS website
 EUMS on Last.fm

1867 establishments in Scotland
Musical groups established in 1867
Music Society
Music organisations based in Scotland
Scottish choirs
Scottish orchestras
Music in Edinburgh
University musical groups in the United Kingdom